is a train station in Yodogawa-ku, Osaka, Osaka Prefecture, Japan.

Line
West Japan Railway Company
JR Kyoto Line (Tōkaidō Main Line)

History
Higashi-Yodogawa Station opened on 1 April 1940. When the Tōkaidō Shinkansen and Shin-Osaka Station opened in 1964, the original plan was to close Higashi-Yodogawa (only  from Shin-Osaka in what was then a largely rural area), but neighborhood residents' objections succeeded in keeping the station open. This distance is the shortest between any two stations on the JR Kyoto Line, as well as between any two stations on the entirety of the Tōkaidō Main Line, followed closely by Tokyo–Yūrakuchō on the Yamanote Line and the Keihin-Tōhoku Line and Sannomiya–Motomachi on the JR Kobe Line, at  each.

Station numbering was introduced to the station in March 2018 with Higashi-Yodogawa being assigned station number JR-A45.

The original station was demolished and replaced by a new building in 2019. Along with the new facility, several roadway grade crossings were closed in the process to facilitate better traffic flow on surrounding roads that were often backed up due to long closures for rail traffic.

Layout
The station has two island platforms, each of which exclusively serves up or down trains. The outer side of each platform is fenced as all trains on the outer tracks pass through this station without stopping.

Adjacent stations

References

Railway stations in Japan opened in 1940
Railway stations in Osaka Prefecture
Tōkaidō Main Line